James F. Blumstein is an American legal and health scholar. He is a professor at Vanderbilt University and is cited by the university as "among the nation’s most prominent scholars of health law, law and medicine, and voting rights." He has worked at the law faculty of the university since 1970. A recipient of the Earl Sutherland Prize for lifetime achievement, he was elected a member of the National Academy of Sciences' Institute of Medicine. In 2007, he received the McDonald-Merrill-Ketcham Memorial Award for Excellence in Law and Medicine from the Indiana University.

Blumstein has been particularly active with promoting state reform and has served as Tennessee Governor Phil Bredesen’s counsel on TennCare reform and has spoken on several Supreme Court cases. In February 2011, Blumestein was part of a three-member panel at the university which consisted of himself, tort-reform advocate and lawyer Ted Frank, and Charlie Ross, a former State Senator in Mississippi, presenting their perspectives on how the business and people of the state would benefit from tort reform. The panelists argued that "Tennessee’s current civil justice system is both inconsistent and unsustainable" and it was argued that, based on reforms in other states, a reform in this area could result in 30,000 jobs a year or 577 jobs each week in Tennessee and significantly improve the health system.

Blumstein is the author of Health Care Law and Policy (2nd edition, Foundation Press, 1998 & 2007 supp.) (co-edited with C. Havighurst & T. Brennan).

References

External links
Vanderbilt University page

American legal scholars
Living people
Year of birth missing (living people)
Vanderbilt University Law School faculty
Members of the National Academy of Medicine